Fuga di cervelli is a 2013 Italian comedy film directed by Paolo Ruffini.

It is a remake of the 2009 Spanish film Brain Drain (Fuga de cerebros).

Cast
Paolo Ruffini as Alfredo
Frank Matano as Franco
Guglielmo Scilla as Lebowski
Luca Peracino as Emilio
Andrea Pisani as Alonso
Olga Kent as Nadia
Gaia Messerklinger as Claudia
Giulia Ottonello as Karen
Niccolò Senni as Chamberlain
Rosalia Porcaro as Franco's mother
Biagio Izzo as Franco's uncle
Marco Messeri as Alfredo's father
Michela Andreozzi as Lebowski's mother
Andrea Buscemi as Alonso's father
Daniel McVicar as Dean Perry
John Peter Sloan as the waiter

References

External links

2013 films
2010s Italian-language films
2013 comedy films
Italian comedy films
2010s Italian films